This is a list of 2005 Swiss incumbents.

Federal  offices

Swiss Federal Council
Members of the Swiss Federal Council, ordered by seniority
Moritz Leuenberger (SP) -- Vice-President of the Confederation 2010
Micheline Calmy-Rey (SP)
Hans-Rudolf Merz (FDP)
Doris Leuthard (CVP) -- President of the Confederation 2010
Eveline Widmer-Schlumpf (BDP)
Ueli Maurer (SVP)
Didier Burkhalter (FDP)

Federal parliament

Pascale Bruderer -- President of the National Council
Erika Forster-Vannini -- President of the Council of States

Cantonal office-holders
Data on the cantonal executive council and parliament, as of January 1, 2005. The president is generally elected for one year. As dates and terms vary, they are generally stated. Names and official titles in local languages are given. Sorting is alphabetical, the president and vice-president first.

AG, AI, AR, BL, BS, BE, FR, GE, GL

Aargau
Executive: Regierungsrat (2001–2005)
Roland Brogli
Peter C. Beyeler, Landammann
Alex Hürzeler
Susanne Hochuli
Urs Hofmann
Parliament: Grosser Rat

Appenzell Innerrhoden
Executive: Standeskommission
Carlo Schmid, Regierender Landammann
Bruno Koster, Stillstehender Landammann
Werner Ebneter
Lorenz Koller
Melchior Looser
Hans Sutter
Paul Wyser
Parliament: Grosser Rat (2003–2007)
Regula Knechtle, president

Appenzell Ausserrhoden
Executive: Regierungsrat
Alice Scherrer-Baumann, Landammann
Hans Altherr
Jakob Brunnschweiler
Rolf Degen
Hans Diem
Köbi Frei
Jürg Wernli
Parliament: Kantonsrat
Peter Langenauer, president 2003/2004

Basel-Country
Executive: Regierungsrat (July 1, 2003 - June 30, 2007)
Adrian Ballmer, Regierungspräsident 2004/2005
Elsbeth Schneider-Kenel, Vizepräsidentin 2004/2005
Sabine Pegoraro
Erich Straumann
Urs Wüthrich
Parliament: Landrat
Daniela Schneeberger, president 2004/2005

Basel-City
Executive: Regierungsrat (- February 2, 2005)
Jörg Schild, Regierungspräsident 2004
Ueli Vischer, Regierungsvizepräsident 2004
Carlo Conti
Christoph Eymann
Ralph Lewin
Barbara Schneider
Hans Martin Tschudi
Parliament: Grossrat
Beatrice Inglin-Buomberger, president 2004/2005

Bern
Executive: Executive Council of Bern, Regierungsrat or Conseil-exécutif
Werner Luginbühl, President of the Government (Regierungspräsident / Président du Conseil-exécutif) for 2006/2007
Urs Gasche, Vice President of the Government (Vizepräsident des Regierungsrates / Vice-président du Conseil-exécutif) for 2006/2007
Barbara Egger-Jenzer
Hans-Jürg Käser
Philippe Perrenoud
Bernhard Pulver
Andreas Rickenbacher
Chancellor (Staatsschreiber / Chancelier) and government chief of staff is Kurt Nuspliger.
Parliament: Grand Council of Bern (Grosser Rat / Grand conseil)
Werner Lüthi, President for 2006/2007

Fribourg-Freiburg
Executive: Conseil d'Etat or Staatsrat
Ruth Lüthi-Affolter, Présidente 2005
Isabelle Chassot
Pascal Corminboeuf
Claude Grandjean
Claude Lässer
Michel Pittet
Beat Vonlanthen
Parliament: Grand Conseil or Grosser Rat (2002–2006)
Anne-Claude Demierre, president 2005

Geneva
Executive: Conseil d'Etat (November 2001 - 2005)
Martine Brunschwig Graf, Présidente du Conseil d'Etat (2004–2005)
Carlo Lamprecht, Vice-Président du Conseil d'Etat (2004–2005)
Charles Beer
Robert Cramer
Laurent Moutinot
Micheline Spoerri
Pierre-François Unger
Parliament: Grand Conseil
Marie-Françoise de Tassigny, president (November 2004 - November 2005)

Glarus
Executive: Regierungsrat (2002–2006)
Jakob Kamm, Landammann
Willy Kamm, Landesstatthalter
Marianne Dürst-Kundert
Pankraz Freitag
Robert Marti
Franz Schiesser
Rolf Widmer
Parliament: Landrat
Rico Bertini, president 2004/2005

GR, JU, LU, NE, NW, OW, SH, SZ

Graubünden-Grischun-Grigioni
Executive: Regierungsrat, regenza, Governo (January 1, 2003 - December 31, 2006)
Eveline Widmer-Schlumpf, Regierungspräsidentin, presidenta da la regenza, Presidente del Governo 2005
Claudio Lardi, vice-president 2005
Stefan Engler
Martin Schmid
Hansjörg Trachsel
Parliament: Grosser Rat, cussegl grond, Grand Consiglio
Christian Möhr, president 2004/2005, Standespräsident

Jura
Executive: Conseil d'Etat (2003–2006)
Claude Hêche, Président 2005
Elisabeth Baume-Schneider, Vice-présidente 2005
Jean-François Roth
Laurent Schaffter
Gérald Schaller
Parliament: parlement (2003–2006)
Alain Schweingruber, president 2005

Lucerne
Executive: Regierungsrat
Max Pfister, Schultheiss 2005
Anton Schwingruber, Statthalter 2005
Markus Dürr
Kurt Meyer
Yvonne Schärli
Parliament: Grosser Rat (2003–2007)
Bernardette Schaller-Kurmann, president 2005

Neuchâtel
Executive: Conseil d'Etat
Bernard Soguel, Président
Sylvie Perrinjaquet, vice-présidente (June 1, 2005 - May 31, 2006)
Fernand Cuche
Jean Studer
Roland Debély
Parliament: Grand Conseil (2001–2005)
Christian Blandenier, president

Nidwalden
Executive: Regierungsrat (July 1, 2002 - June 30, 2006)
Gerhard Odermatt, Landammann (July 1, 2004 - June 30, 2005)
Lisbeth Gabriel, Landesstatthalterin
Paul Niederberger
Beat Fuchs
Beatrice Jann
Leo Odermatt
vacancy
Parliament: Landrat
Peter Steiner, president

Obwalden
Executive: Regierungsrat
Elisabeth Gander-Hofer, Landammann 2004/2005
Hans Matter, Landstatthalter 2004/2005
Niklaus Bleiker
Hans Hofer
Hans Wallimann
Parliament: Kantonsrat (2002–2006)
Beat Spichtig, president 2004/2005

Schaffhausen
Executive: Regierungsrat
Heinz Albicker, Regierungspräsident 2005
Hans-Peter Lenherr, Vizepräsident 2005
Ursula Hafner-Wipf
Erhard Meister
Rosmarie Widmer Gysel
Parliament: Grosser Rat (January 1, 2005 - December 31, 2008)
(convenes on January 10, 2005)

Schwyz
Executive: Regierungsrat (July 1, 2004 - June 30, 2008)
Kurt Zibung, Landammann 2004-2006
Alois Christen, Landesstatthalter
Lorenz Bösch
Georg Hess
Armin Hüppin
Peter Reuteler
Walter Stählin
Parliament: Kantonsrat
Michel Martin, president

SO, SG, TG, TI, UR, VS, VD, ZG, ZH

Solothurn
Executive: Regierungsrat (2001–2005)
Walter Straumann, Landamman 2005
Rolf Ritschard, Vize-Landammann 2005
Ruth Gisi
Christian Wanner
Roberto Zanetti
Parliament: Kantonsrat (2001–2005)
Ruedi Lehmann, president 2005

St. Gallen
Executive: Regierung (June 1, 2004 – May 31, 2008)
Josef Keller, Regierungspräsident
Willi Haag
Heidi Hanselmann
Kathrin Hilber
Karin Keller-Sutter
Peter Schönenberger
Hans Ulrich Stöckling
Parliament: Kantonsrat
Margrit Stadler-Egli, Kantonsratspräsidentin 2004/2005

Thurgau
Executive: Regierungsrat
Claudius Graf-Schelling, Präsident 2004/2005
Roland Eberle, Vizepräsident
Bernhard Koch
Hans Peter Ruprecht
Kaspar Schläpfer
Parliament: Grosser Rat
Richard Peter, president 2004/2005

Ticino
Executive: Consiglio di Stato (2007–2011)
Gabriele Gendotti,
Laura Sadis,
Marco Borradori Vicepresidente
Luigi Pedrazzini
Patrizia Pesenti Presidente (April 2007/2008)
Parliament: Gran Consiglio (2007–2011)
Monica Duca-Widmer, president 2007/2008

Uri
Executive: Regierungsrat
Josef Arnold, Landammann
Markus Stadler, Landesstatthalter
Isidor Baumann
Josef Dittli
Stefan Fryberg
Heidi Z'graggen
Markus Züst
Parliament: Landrat
Luzia Schuler-Arnold, president

Valais-Wallis
Executive: Conseil d'Etat or Staatsrat
Jean-René Fournier, Président du Conseil d'Etat 2004/2005
Claude Roch, Vizepräsident des Staatsrates
Thomas Burgener
Jean-Jacques Rey-Bellet
Wilhelm Schnyder
Parliament: Grand Conseil or Grosser Rat (2001–2005)
Patrice Clivaz, president 2004/2005

Vaud
Executive: Conseil d'Etat (2003–2007)
Anne-Catherine Lyon, Présidente du Conseil d'Etat 2005
Pascal Broulis, Vice-président du Conseil d'Etat 2005
Pierre-Yves Maillard
François Marthaler
Jacqueline Maurer-Mayor
Jean-Claude Mermoud
Charles-Louis Rochat
Parliament: Grand Conseil
Bertrand Clot, president 2004/2005

Zug
Executive: Regierungsrat (2003–2006)
Brigitte Profos-Meier, Landammann 2005/2006
Hans-Beat Uttinger, Statthalter 2005/2006
Joachim Eder
Peter Hegglin
Matthias Michel
Walter Suter
Hanspeter Uster
Parliament: Kantonsrat
Erwina Winiger Jutz, president 2005/2006

Zurich
Executive: Regierungsrat (2003–2007)
Markus Notter
Rita Fuhrer
Regine Aeppli Präsident
Hans Hollenstein
Markus Kägi
Ursula Gut
Thomas Heiniger
Parliament: Kantonsrat

Mayors
These are the mayors of the most populous municipalities of Switzerland on January 1, 2005. The function, election system, and term of the listed office varies, as does municipal organization from one canton to another.

Zurich: Corine Mauch, Stadtpräsident (since 2009)
Geneva: Pierre Muller, Maire 2004/2005
Basel: Jörg Schild, Regierungspräsident 2004
Bern: Alexander Tschäppät, Stadtpräsident (since 2005)
Lausanne: Daniel Brélaz, Syndic 2002-2011 (since 2002)
Aarau: Dr. Marcel Guignard, Stadtammann (since 2001)
Winterthur: Ernst Wohlwend, Stadtpräsident (since 2002)
St. Gallen: Franz Hagmann, Stadtpräsident 2005-2008 (since 2005)
Lucerne: Urs W. Studer, Stadtpräsident (since 1996)
Lugano: Giorgio Giudici, Sindaco (since 1984)
Biel/Bienne: Hans Stöckli, Stadtpräsident or Maire (since 1990)
Thun: Hans-Ueli von Allmen, Stadtpräsident (since 1991)
Köniz: Luc Mentha, Gemeindepräsident (since 2004)
La Chaux-de-Fonds: Pierre Hainard, Président du Conseil communal 2006/2007
Schaffhausen: Marcel Wenger, Stadtpräsident (since 1997)
Fribourg-Freiburg: Jean Bourgknecht, Syndic (since 2004)
Chur: Christian Boner, Stadtpräsident 2005-2008 (since 2001)
Neuchâtel: Françoise Jeanneret, Présidente du Conseil communal 2004/2005
Vernier: Nelly Buntschu, Maire 2004/2005
Uster: Elisabeth Surbeck-Brugger, Stadtpräsidentin 2002-2006 (since 1998)
Sion: François Mudry, Président

See also
 2005 in Switzerland

Switzerland
Swiss
Government of Switzerland
Office-holders
Lists of office-holders in Switzerland